General James A. Van Fleet State Trail is a rail trail in Florida, named after General James A. Van Fleet, who was a distinguished combat commander in both World Wars and the Korean War.

It is protected as a Florida State Park and occupies a  abandoned portion of the Seaboard Air Line Railroad's Miami Subdivision through Central Florida's Green Swamp area. It extends from Polk City in the south to Mabel in the north.

It passes through Bay Lake and crosses Lake, Polk and Sumter counties.

Fauna
Among the wildlife that can be seen along the trail are egrets, herons and various raptors. Also sighted are white-tailed deer, Florida gopher tortoises, American alligators, raccoons and nine-banded armadillos.

Recreational activities
Activities include walking, running, inline skating, hiking, horseback riding, biking, and viewing wildlife.

Hours and fees
Florida state parks are open between 8 a.m. and sundown every day of the year (including holidays). There is no admission necessary to use the park.

Accessibility
These are located in Polk City at the intersection of State Road 33 and County Road 665; Green Pond at the intersection of Green Pond Road and the trail itself; Bay Lake at the intersection of Bay Lake Road (County Road 565) and the trail itself; and finally in Mabel where the trail intersects with State Road 50. The right of way for the former railroad line continues north on its way to Coleman. This line carried the Silver Meteor between Coleman and Auburndale until 1988, and had a bridge under SR 50 until the early-2010s.

Amenities
Amenities include a picnic pavilion, several picnic tables, restrooms, and drinking fountains.

Parking, restrooms, and drinking fountains are available at all four trailheads.

Gallery

Notes

External links

Florida's Greenways & Trails
 General James A. Van Fleet Trail State Park
 Van Fleet State Trail
General James A. Van Fleet State Trail at Absolutely Florida
Van Fleet State Trail at Wildernet
Van Fleet State Trail at 100 Florida Trails
Biking Orlando's Paved Trails

State parks of Florida
Parks in Lake County, Florida
Parks in Polk County, Florida
Parks in Sumter County, Florida
Rail trails in Florida
Bike paths in Florida
Former CSX Transportation lines
National Recreation Trails in Florida